Aurélie Dupont (born 15 January 1973 in Paris) is a French ballet dancer who performed with the Paris Opera Ballet as an Étoile.

She began her career in dance in 1983 when she entered the Paris Opera Ballet School (L’École de danse de l’Opéra de Paris). She joined the company at age sixteen in 1989, and became a première danseuse in December 1996. Dupont was promoted to star dancer (Étoile) in 1998 after her performance as Kitri in Paris Opera Ballet's revival of Nureyev's production of Don Quixote. She has also starred in Paris Opera Ballet's revival of Nureyev's version of The Sleeping Beauty.

In 2010, Cédric Klapisch released a documentary about Dupont, L'espace d'un instant, which had been made over the previous two years.

Dupont formally retired from the Paris Opera stage following a performance of Kenneth MacMillan's Manon on 18 May 2015. It was announced on 5 Feb 2016 that she would be the next director of dance for the Paris Opera Ballet after the resignation of Benjamin Millepied. In June 2022, Dupont announced that she would leave the company the following month.

Repertoire
Dupont's repertoire includes:

 
 Don Quixote
 La Bayadère
 Sylvia
 Giselle
 Swan Lake
 Romeo and Juliet

 The Sleeping Beauty
 Raymonda
 Les Sylphides
 La Sylphide
 The Four Temperaments
 Manon
 Onegin

Awards
 1992 : Gold medallist at the Varna International Ballet Competition (category juniors)
 1993 : Winner of the French 
 1994 : Winner of the AROP (Association pour le rayonnement de l'Opéra national de Paris)
 2002 : Prix Benois de la Danse
 2005 : Chevalier of the Ordre des Arts et des Lettres

References

External links
 Ballet magazine interview, December 2003
 

Prima ballerinas
French ballerinas
1973 births
Living people
Prix Benois de la Danse winners
Paris Opera Ballet étoiles
Chevaliers of the Ordre des Arts et des Lettres